Edward Latimer Beach Jr. (April 20, 1918 – December 1, 2002) was a highly decorated United States Navy submarine officer and best-selling author.

During World War II, he participated in the Battle of Midway and 12 combat patrols, earning 10 decorations for gallantry, including the Navy Cross.  After the war, he served as the naval aide to the President of the United States, Dwight D. Eisenhower, and commanded the first submerged circumnavigation.

Beach's best-selling novel, Run Silent, Run Deep, was made into the 1958 movie by the same name. The son of Captain Edward L. Beach Sr. and Alice Fouché Beach, Beach Jr. was born in New York City and raised in Palo Alto, California.

Naval career
Beach was appointed to the U.S. Naval Academy in 1935 by Senator Hiram Johnson of California. Beach served as a regimental commander in his first class year. Beach was named as the midshipman who had done the most to promote naval spirit and loyalty in his regiment when he graduated second out of 576 men in his class in 1939.

Beach was initially assigned to the heavy cruiser , before joining the newly recommissioned destroyer , which participated in the neutrality patrol in the Atlantic, the escort of the German passenger liner , the initial American occupation of Iceland, and convoy duty in the North Atlantic.

Beach was detached from Lea in September 1941 to undergo accelerated training at the Submarine Training School at the New London Submarine Base in Connecticut. He completed training, graduating first in his class, in December 1941 shortly after the attack on Pearl Harbor.

World War II

   After graduating from Submarine School, Beach was assigned to USS Trigger (SS-237), which was commissioned on January 30, 1942.   Aboard Trigger Beach held several shipboard positions, including communications officer, engineering officer, navigator, co-approach officer, and executive officer.  While aboard Trigger, he participated in the Battle of Midway and served on 10 war patrols.  Trigger was awarded the Presidential Unit Citation and the Navy Unit Citation during Beach's time aboard her.

Beach was assigned to the new commissioned USS Tirante (SS-420) late in 1944.  He served as executive officer under Lieutenant Commander George L. Street, who was awarded the Medal of Honor for a making a daring attack in a heavily defended Japanese harbor during Tirantes first war patrol from March 3 to April 26, 1945.  Beach received the Navy Cross for heroism during the same patrol and Tirante received the Presidential Unit Citation.

Beach assumed command of USS Piper (SS-409) at Pearl Harbor on June 25, 1945.  Piper departed on her third war patrol on July 19 and entered the Sea of Japan on August 13.  The war ended on August 14 and Piper was in Japanese waters when the formal surrender was signed on September 2 and started her return to Pearl Harbor the next day.

During World War II, Beach earned 10 decorations for gallantry, including the Navy Cross and three unit citations, and participated in 12 war patrols that damaged or sank 45 enemy vessels.

Cold War
In December 1945, Beach reported to the Department of the Navy to serve as the personal aide to Vice Admiral Louis E. Denfeld, the chief of the Bureau of Naval Personnel.  In March 1947, he was attached to the Atomic Defense Section (OPNAV 36) under Rear Admiral William S. Parsons.

USS Amberjack
Amberjack gained the nickname "Anglejack" because of its pioneering use of steep diving and surfacing angles, which was immortalized in the January 1950 edition of the National Geographic magazine. During war games, Amberjack photographed the opposing task force's flagship through its periscope and sent the admiral a copy inscribed with "Regards from Ned Beach and the Amberjack."

Joint Chiefs of Staff
His tour as skipper of Amberjack was abbreviated as he was called to Washington to serve as naval aide to General Omar Bradley, the first Chairman of the Joint Chiefs of Staff, in August 1949. In that post, Beach witnessed first hand the events surrounding the Revolt of the Admirals.

USS Trigger
Upon completing his tour of duty as Bradley's aide in March 1951, Beach was named prospective commanding officer of the new , then under construction. Upon commissioning of Trigger II, which was named for  lost during World War II, he became commanding officer of the second submarine to be completed in the new  after World War II.

The White House
From 1953 to 1957, Beach was naval aide to President Dwight D. Eisenhower.  As naval aide Beach was responsible for the management of Camp David, the White House Mess, and for the presidential yacht . Because Eisenhower had made a campaign promise to get rid of the presidential yacht, neither the efforts of Beach nor those of Mrs. Eisenhower were successful in dissuading him from that course of action. The elimination of Williamsburg proved to be a bureaucratic hassle for Beach and the Navy Department since Williamsburg was the funnel for all budgets and personnel for Camp David and the White House Mess. While working the White House, Beach volunteered to be the coordinator on the White House staff for all plans to protect the president in case of nuclear attack. Since the Secret Service in 1953 did not deem helicopter travel as safe, evacuating the president on short notice was planned by Beach via the Potomac River, several PT (patrol torpedo) boats and a high speed race down river to meet up with a waiting Navy ship.  It was Beach who spearheaded the effort to get First Lady Mamie Eisenhower to christen , the world's first nuclear-powered submarine, in 1954.

Beach was advanced to the rank of captain on October 1, 1956.

USS Salamonie
He completed a deployment to the U.S. Sixth Fleet, operating in the Mediterranean Sea, in December 1957.

USS Triton
In January 1958, he attended the Navy's training program for atomic reactors in order to qualify for his next command, the nation's fifth nuclear-powered submarine.

In November 1959, Beach took command of USS Triton, the only American nuclear-powered submarine to be equipped with two nuclear reactors. The route of Triton followed roughly that of Ferdinand Magellan in 1519-1522. The scientific and military significance of the Triton voyage was overshadowed by the U-2 Incident which broke just as USS Triton was returning.

For successfully completing its mission, Triton was awarded the Presidential Unit Citation.  At a special White House ceremony, Captain Beach was presented the Legion of Merit by President Eisenhower.  Beach wrote about Tritons voyage in his book Around the World Submerged: The Voyage of the Triton, published in 1962.

Following her post-shakedown availability, Triton deployed to European waters with the Second Fleet to participate in NATO exercises against British naval forces led by the aircraft carriers  and  under the command of Rear Admiral Sir Charles Madden.  This deployment was culminated with a port visit to Bremerhaven, West Germany, the first visit by a nuclear-powered ship to a European port.

Subron 8, National War College and OpNav
After his tour in command of Triton, Beach commanded Submarine Squadron Eight from July 1961 to August 1962. He was next a student at the National War College, where he completed a course of study in July 1963.  At the same time he earned a Master of Arts degree in international relations from George Washington University.

In May 1963, Eugene Parks Wilkinson and Beach were in competition for selection to rear admiral, and the board selected Wilkinson with Beach's sincere congratulations.

From July 1963 to December 1966, Beach served in the office of the Chief of Naval Operations (OpNav) preparing annual budget reports for Congress and preparing the Secretary of the Navy (Fred Korth, Paul B. Fay, and Paul H. Nitze) and the Chief of Naval Operations (George W. Anderson Jr. and David L. McDonald) for hearings before Congressional committees.

Beach retired from active duty with the rank of captain in 1966, after 27 years of service.

Naval War College and Capitol Hill
Beach retired from active duty in the Navy in 1966, and was appointed as the Stephen B. Luce Chair of Naval Science at the Naval War College in Newport, Rhode Island — the first person to hold that position.  During his tenure he was the editor of the Naval War College Review.

Subsequently, Beach served for seven years as staff director of the United States Senate Republican Policy Committee, and for one year as chief of staff for Senator Jeremiah Denton (R-Alabama).

Author

After World War II, Beach wrote extensively in his spare time following in the footsteps of his father, who was also a career naval officer and author. His first book Submarine!  (1952) was a compilation of accounts of several wartime patrols made by his own as well as other submarines, which Time magazine called "the liveliest and most authentic account of underseas combat to come out of World War II."

In all, Beach published thirteen books, but is best known for his first novel, Run Silent, Run Deep (1955), which appeared on The New York Times Book Review bestseller list for several months.  A movie of the same name, based loosely on the novel and starring Clark Gable and Burt Lancaster, was released by United Artists in 1958 (Beach was unhappy with the adaptation). Beach penned two sequels to Run Silent, Run Deep: Dust on the Sea (1972), relating in detail a war patrol by Eel leading a wolfpack, and Cold is the Sea (1978), set in 1961 aboard a nuclear submarine.

In addition to Submarine!, Beach wrote several more books on naval history, including The Wreck of the Memphis (1966); United States Navy: 200 Years (1986), a general history of the Navy; Scapegoats: A Defense of Kimmel and Short at Pearl Harbor (1995); and Salt and Steel: Reflections of a Submariner (1999). Keepers of the Sea (1983) is a pictorial record of the modern navy with photography by Fred J. Maroon. For a number of years Beach was co-editor of Naval Terms Dictionary as that standard reference work passed through several editions. His last work, completed shortly before his death, was to prepare for publication his father's manuscript of his own distinguished service in the navy. That book, From Annapolis to Scapa Flow: The Autobiography of Edward L. Beach, Sr (2003), is Captain Beach Sr.'s personal account of the navy from the age of sail to the age of steam.

In addition to his books, Beach was a prolific author of articles and book reviews for periodicals ranging from Blue Book to National Geographic, and Naval History to American Heritage.

Bibliography
Fiction:
Run Silent, Run Deep (New York: Holt, Rinehart and Winston, 1955)
Dust on the Sea (New York: Holt, Rinehart and Winston, 1972)
Cold is the Sea (New York: Holt, Rinehart and Winston, 1978)
Memoirs:
From Annapolis to Scapa Flow: The Autobiography of Edward L. Beach, Sr. (Annapolis Maryland: Naval Institute Press, 2002) co-authored with his father
Salt and Steel: Reflections of a Submariner (Annapolis, MD: Naval Institute Press, 1999)
Non-fiction:
Around the World Submerged: The Voyage of the Triton (New York: Holt, Rinehart and Winston, 1962)
Keepers of the Sea (photos by Fred J. Maroon) (Annapolis, MD: Naval Institute Press, 1983)
Naval Terms Dictionary, in collaboration with John V. Noel Jr, 4th edition (Annapolis, MD: Naval Institute Press, 1971)
Naval Terms Dictionary, in collaboration with John V. Noel Jr, 5th edition (Annapolis, MD: Naval Institute Press, 1978)
Naval Terms Dictionary, in collaboration with John V. Noel Jr, 6th edition (Annapolis, MD: Naval Institute Press, 1988)
Scapegoats: A Defense of Kimmel and Short at Pearl Harbor (Annapolis, MD: Naval Institute Press, 1995)
Submarine! (New York: Holt, Rinehart and Winston, 1952)
The United States Navy: 200 Years (New York: Henry Holt, 1986)
The Wreck of the Memphis (New York: Holt, Rinehart and Winston, 1966)
Run Silent, Run Deep and  The Wreck of the Memphis were republished in hardcover by the Naval Institute Press as part of its Classics of Naval Literature series while Around the World Submerged, Submarine!, Dust on the Sea, and Cold is the Sea were reprinted in quality paperback editions as part of its Bluejacket Books series

Family
Beach married Ingrid Schenck, daughter of Stanford University professor Hubert G. Schenck and Inga Bergström Schenck, in Palo Alto in 1944. They had four children: Inga-Marie (1945–1948), Edward A. (b. 1948), Hugh S. (b. 1949) and Ingrid Alice (b. 1952).

Awards and decorations
During his service in the United States Navy, Beach was awarded the Navy Cross, the Silver Star with Gold Star in lieu of a second Silver Star, the Legion of Merit, the Bronze Star  with a combat Distinguished "V" and Gold Star in lieu of a second Bronze Star Medal with a combat Distinguished "V", Letter of Commendation Ribbon with Gold Star in lieu of second award and "V" device from the Commander in Chief of the Pacific Fleet, three Presidential Unit Citations, the Navy Unit Commendation, American Defense Service Medal with Atlantic Fleet Clasp, the American Campaign Medal, the Asiatic-Pacific Campaign Medal with three engagement stars, the World War II Victory Medal and the National Defense Service Medal with bronze service star in lieu of second award.

Navy Cross

Bureau of Naval Personnel Information Bulletin No. 345 – December 1945

Silver Star

Gold Star to denote a second Silver Star:

Legion of Merit

The White House – May 10, 1960

Bronze Star, with Combat "V"

Gold Star in lieu of second Bronze Star, with Combat"V":

Letter of commendation

Letter of Commendation Ribbon with Gold Star in lieu of second award and "V" device from the Commander in Chief of the Pacific Fleet:

Presidential Unit Citation

USS Trigger

USS Tirante

USS Triton

The White House – May 10, 1960

Navy Unit Commendation

USS Trigger

Other awards

Honors

Sword of the Class of 1897 from the United States Naval Academy upon Beach's graduation in 1939.
Giant of Adventure Award (1960) from the popular men's magazine Argosy, which dubbed Beach the "Magellan of the Deep" for the submerged circumnavigation by USS Triton.
 Honorary Doctor of Science (Sc.D) from the American International College, whose citation reads: "Your most recent exploit in commanding the largest submarine in existence during an historic submerged voyage around the globe has won for you and your crew the admiration of the world you circled."
Magellanic Premium (1961) from the American Philosophical Society in recognition of the first submerged circumnavigation by the Triton.
Theodore and Franklin D. Roosevelt Prize in Naval History (1987) from the New York Council of the Navy League, in cooperation with the Roosevelt Institute and the Theodore Roosevelt Association, for his book The United States Navy: 200 Years (Henry Holt, 1986).
Alfred Thayer Mahan Award for Literary Achievement (1980; 2000) from the Navy League.
The Naval Historical Foundation History Prize has been renamed The Captain Edward L. Beach Prize.
The Beach Award for non-technical writing or documentation that promotes personal submarines presented by the Personal Submersible Organization (PSUBS.ORG) is named in Captain Beach's honor.
Beach Hall, the United States Naval Institute's headquarters on the grounds of the United States Naval Academy in Annapolis, Maryland, is named in honor of both Captains Beach.  Captain Beach Jr., is buried in front of the entrance to Beach Hall, close to the bank of the Severn River of Maryland.
U.S. Navy Museum included Captain Beach, and Operation Sandblast as part of the Technology for the Nuclear Age: Nuclear Propulsion display for its Cold War exhibit.
Samuel Eliot Morison Award for Naval Literature (1999) for Salt and Steel: Reflections of a Submariner

Legacy

Author Tom Clancy summarized Beach's many accomplishments and contributions when he wrote:

Ed Offley of DefenseWatch wrote:

References

Further reading
 
 Edward L. Beach Jr. Around the World Submerged: The Voyage of the Triton (New York:  Holt, Rinehart and Winston, 1962) LCC: 62-18406 (paperback)
 Edward L. Beach Jr. Submarine! (New York:  Holt, Rinehart and Winston, 1952) paperback, 
 Edward L. Beach Jr. Salt and Steel: Reflections of a Submariner (Annapolis, MD: Naval Institute Press, 1999) 
 "Edward L Beach" Current Biography (1960)
Captain Edward L. Beach: Papers, 1953 1961 @ Dwight D. Eisenhower Library – Abilene, Kansas
Beneath the Waves: The Life and Navy of CAPT Edward L. Beach, Jr by Edward F. Finch. Annapolis: Naval Institute Press, 2010.
 Official Biography – Naval History Division – U.S. Department of the Navy (September 13, 1963)
"Navy Captain, Author Edward Beach" by Martin Weil. The Washington Post (Monday December 2002), page B6
"Edward L. Beach Author and First Round-the-World Submariner, Dies at 84" by Richard Goldstein. The New York Times (Monday December 2002), page B8

External links

 Papers and Records of Edward L. Beach, Dwight D. Eisenhower Presidential Library
Edward L. Beach Papers, 1883-2000 (bulk 1951-1999) MS 422 held by Special Collections & Archives, Nimitz Library at the United States Naval Academy

Reminiscences of Edward Latimer Beach — Oral History – Eisenhower Administrative File – Columbia University
"In Memoriam – Capt. Edward L. Beach Jr. USN (SS)" by Ed Offley. – DefenseWatch (December 4, 2002)
"Around the world, all under the sea – Captain Edward Beach, Submariner, writer 1918-2002" reprint – The Daily Telegraph – December 21, 2002
"Captain Edward L. Beach" – Times (London) – December 4, 2002
Captain Edward L. Beach Jr.: "His Work Will Live On" Naval Institute Proceedings (January 2003)
Profile @ Submarine Pioneers, Office of Naval Information (CINFO)
August 1999 Interview — All Hands magazine
Captain Edward L. Beach biography at FleetSubmarine.com

Profile @ Sharkhunters International Inc.
Profile @ USS Salamonie (AO-26) Official Website
Profile @ USS Triton (SSRN-586) Website
"Longtime Submariner Remembered as Warrior-Poet" by JOC Michael Foutch, USN.  Office of Naval Information – Department of the Navy – Washington, D.C.
Tribute Page includes article by Richard Goldstein, The New York Times dated December 2, 2002
Captain Edward L. Beach, USN, (1867-1943), Dictionary of American Fighting Ships, Naval Historical Center, Department of the Navy. (Father's biography)
Seapower Confronts the Twenty-first Century: An Interview With Edward L. Beach by Nathan Miller – American Heritage – April/May 1983

 
1918 births
2002 deaths
20th-century American novelists
20th-century American male writers
United States Navy personnel of World War II
National War College alumni
American naval historians
Naval War College faculty
Beach Jr
United States Navy captains
United States submarine commanders
Recipients of the Navy Cross (United States)
Recipients of the Silver Star
Recipients of the Legion of Merit
Burials at the United States Naval Academy Cemetery
Circumnavigators of the globe
Eisenhower administration personnel
Military aides to the President of the United States
Military personnel from New York City
Writers from Palo Alto, California
American male novelists
American male non-fiction writers
Historians from New York (state)
Historians from California